Frank Hurley (7 June 1915 − 22 May 1992) was an Australian professional rugby league footballer who played in the 1930s and 1940s.

Playing career

Newtown

Frank Hurley attended Sydney Boys High and played Rugby Union for the school and represented GPS.

After leaving school he joined Drummoyne Rugby Union Club and played 1st Grade. He trailed for Newtown in 1935 and was offered a contract.

Hurley played for Newtown and in 1936 was selected to play for New South Wales.

Hurley played left-wing, i.e. number 5, in New South Wales' 30-13 victory over Queensland in the 1936 Interstate rugby league series at Sydney Cricket Ground on Saturday 16 May 1936, in front of a crowd of 36,021. He also played in their 24-13 victory over Queensland on Saturday 23 May, in front of a crowd of 27,539, and then played in the 18-14 victory over Great Britain during the Lions tour on Saturday 6 June 1936, in front of a crowd of 49,519.

Hull
On Tuesday 23 February 1937, the Mayor of Newtown, Alderman Fred Newnham, a solicitor, presided over a farewell ceremony for Hurley at Newtown Town Hall, and speeches expressing good wishes were made by aldermen of Newtown, and officials of the Newtown Bluebags. On Wednesday 24 February 1937, Hurley left Australia bound for England to play for Hull F.C.

He became the first overseas player to score a hat-trick of tries for Hull F.C. in the Hull Kingston Rovers derby match. Only two other overseas players have since equalled this feat; Tevita Vaikona and Fetuli Talanoa.

Hurley played right-wing, i.e. number 2, in Hull's 10-18 defeat by Huddersfield in the 1938 Yorkshire County Cup Final during the 1938–39 season at Odsal Stadium, Bradford on Saturday 22 October 1938, in front of a crowd of 28,714.

Return to Australia and later years
Hurley had hoped to play for Hull for four years, however the start of World War II on 1 September 1939 curtailed his stay in England and, upon his return to Australia, he rejoined Newtown playing briefly during the 1940 NSWRFL season. He then returned to Britain to serve with No. 10 Squadron RAAF of the Royal Australian Air Force (RAAF) until the end of World War II in 1945. He died after a short illness in 1992, 16 days short of his 77th birthday.

References

External links
Send Off To Frank Hurley
A Statistical History of Rugby League
During the 1930s and 1940s team… National Rugby League Museum…
Picture - Newtown Notes by Kerwin Maegraith
FC150: Australians At Hull F.C.
Picture - NSW (New South Wales) v England (Great Britain) 6 June 1936
Pictures of #hullfc150, i.e in 2015, at webpic.co
Picture - Attention! Hull and Huddersfield players lined up at Bradford…
Picture - Australian Winger's Five Tries…
Picture - Hull Scoring Feast on Tyneside
Picture - Leeds Mercury - The All Yorkshire Paper - Hurley Shines
Picture - One Australian To Another…
Picture - Frank Hurley To Go To England Next Week
Picture - Hurley Off To England
Picture - Hurley Invited To Hull
Picture - Frank Hurley in his Hull FC colours. A long way from Newtown!
Picture - Happy 100th birthday Dad. This was August 1939 when he went for a weekend trip from Hull to Germany. Note the German SS soldier in the background.
Picture - Happy 100th Birthday Dad & 150th birthday Hull Rugby League Club

1915 births
1992 deaths
Australian rugby league players
Hull F.C. players
New South Wales rugby league team players
Newtown Jets players
Rugby league players from Sydney
Rugby league wingers
Sportsmen from New South Wales
Royal Australian Air Force personnel of World War II